Temnosceloides is a genus of longhorn beetles of the subfamily Lamiinae, containing the following species:

 Temnosceloides carnusi Meunier, Sudre & Téocchi, 2009
 Temnosceloides hamifer Breuning & Téocchi, 1973

References

Stenobiini